Frederick K. Kahele (November 5, 1900 – March 20, 1976) was an American competition swimmer who represented the United States at the 1920 Summer Olympics in Antwerp, Belgium.  Kahele competed in the men's 400-meter freestyle, advanced to the event final, and finished fourth overall.  He also swam in the finals of the men's 1,500-meter freestyle and finished in fourth place in the second event, too.

References

External links
 

1900 births
1976 deaths
American male freestyle swimmers
Olympic swimmers of the United States
Swimmers at the 1920 Summer Olympics